The 2018 Nigeria Federation Cup (known as the 2018 Aiteo Cup for sponsorship reasons) is the 77th edition of the football tournament. This edition of the competition began on 9 September 2018 and ended on 24 October 2018.

First round
First round matches were played from 9 September to 11 September 2018.

|}

Tornadoes progress to the last 32 after Chief of Staff failed to turn up for the match.

Second round
Second round matches were played from 16, 17 September and 19 September 2018.

|}

Group stage

Group A
(at Patani Stadium, Gombe)

Round 2 [Sep 26]
Katsina United          0-1 Enyimba    
J. Atete                1-3 Plateau United
 
Round 3 [Sep 27]
J. Atete                2-4 Katsina United
Plateau United          1-1 Enyimba
 
Round 1 [Sep 28] (moved from Sep 24)
Plateau United          0-1 Katsina United
J. Atete                0-5 Enyimba

Final Table:

 1.Enyimba FC                         3   2  1  0   7- 1   7  Qualified
 2.Katsina United                     3   2  0  1   5- 3   6  Qualified
 - - - - - - - - - - - - - - - - - - - - - - - - - - - - - -
 3.Plateau United                     3   1  1  1   4- 3   4
 4.Julius Atete FC                    3   0  0  3   3-12   0

Group B
(at Sani Abacha Stadium, Kano)

Round 1 [Sep 24]           
Enugu Rangers           2-1 El-Kanemi Warriors
Sunshine Stars          1-1 Supreme Court  

Round 2 [Sep 26]
Sunshine Stars          1-1 El-Kanemi Warriors 
Supreme Court           n/p Enugu Rangers  
 
Round 3 [Sep 28]
Enugu Rangers           0-0 Sunshine Stars
El-Kaneni Warriors      1-0 Supreme Court

Final Table:

 1.Enugu Rangers International        2   1  1  0   2- 1   4  Qualified
 2.El Kanemi Warriors                 3   1  1  1   3- 3   4  Qualified
 - - - - - - - - - - - - - - - - - - - - - - - - - - - - - -
 3.Sunshine Stars                     3   0  3  0   2- 2   3
 4.Supreme Court FC                   2   0  1  1   1- 2   1

Group C
(at Agege Stadium, Lagos)

Round 1 [Sep 24]
Kwara United            5-1 Abia Warriors
Kano Pillars            3-2 Rivers United   
 
Round 2 [Sep 26]
Kano Pillars            1-2 Abia Warriors
Rivers United           0-1 Kwara United 
 
Round 3 [Sep 28]
Kano Pillars            2-1 Kwara United
Rivers United           0-1 Abia Warriors

Final Table:

 1.Kwara United                       3   2  0  1   7- 3   6  Qualified
 2.Kano Pillars                       3   2  0  1   6- 5   6  Qualified
 - - - - - - - - - - - - - - - - - - - - - - - - - - - - - -
 3.Abia Warriors                      3   2  0  1   4- 6   6
 4.Rivers United                      3   0  0  3   2- 5   0

Group D
(at Enyimba International Stadium, Aba)

Round 1 [Sep 24]
Akwa United             1-0 Wikki Tourists
Nasarawa United         0-0 Kogi United
 
Round 2 [Sep 26]
Kogi United             0-1 Akwa United
Nasarawa United         1-0 Wikki Tourists
 
Round 3 [Sep 28]
Akwa United             0-2 Nasarawa United
Wikki Tourists          1-0 Kogi United
 
Final Table:

 1.Nasarawa United                    3   2  1  0   3- 0   7  Qualified
 2.Akwa United                        3   2  0  1   2- 2   6  Qualified
 - - - - - - - - - - - - - - - - - - - - - - - - - - - - - -
 3.Wikki Tourists                     3   1  0  2   1- 2   3
 4.Kogi United                        3   0  1  2   0- 2   1

Quarter-finals
[Oct 3]
Kwara United            1-3 Katsina United                     [Agege stadium, Lagos]

Enugu Rangers           1-1 Akwa United             [4-2 pen]  [Sani Abacha stadium, Kano]           

[Oct 4]
Nasarawa United         1-0 El-Kanemi Warriors                 [Enyimba stadium, Aba]

[Oct 7]
Enyimba                 2-4 Kano Pillars                       [Patani stadium, Gombe]

Semi-finals
[Oct 10]
Enugu Rangers           4-2 Nasarawa United                    [Sani Abacha stadium, Kano]

Katsina United          2-2 Kano Pillars            [1-4 pen]  [Agege stadium, Lagos]

Final
[Oct 24, Stephen Keshi stadium, Asaba]

Enugu Rangers           3-3 Kano Pillars            [4-2 pen]

References

2018–19 in Nigerian football
Fa Cup